Marina High School is a public high school located in the northwest corner of Huntington Beach, California which first began operating in 1963. Marina is part of the Huntington Beach Union High School District, which includes several other area high schools. The school is located on Springdale Street between Edinger Avenue and McFadden Avenue. In 2009, the school was named a California Distinguished School, the highest honor given to schools in California.

Athletics
Marina's athletic teams are known as the Vikings and their school colors are Navy Blue, Columbia Blue, and Gold. They compete in the Big 4 League of the Golden West Conference California Interscholastic Federation's (CIF) Southern Section. Marina has no on-campus stadium and plays most of its football home games at nearby Westminster High School.

In 2000, Marina's varsity field hockey team played an undefeated season of 13–0 and took both the Sunset League Championship as well as the CIF Championship.

In 2007, Marina Boys Basketball broke the National record for 3-point shots made in a season, making 437 three-pointers.

In 2016, Marina's PoleVaulter Jett Gordon Won the CIF California State Meet and broke the CIF Division II record at 17'2".

In 2021, Marina’s track and field star Elliot Elliott won the CIF California State Meet. She broke a record for longest distance run without water.

Other activities
On September 20, 2013, for the first time, a transgender teen was named as Marina High School's homecoming queen.

Beginning in 2014, the woodshop class of the school (whose mascot is a Viking) began planning, funding, and constructing a replica of a Viking ship.  In May 2016 the ship sailed on its maiden voyage at Sunset Aquatic Marina; short ocean-going trips to Long Beach and Catalina Island are planned for the future.

Notable alumni

 Daric Barton, professional baseball player
 Jake Bauers, professional baseball player
 Robin Beauregard, Olympic medalist
 Vanessa Laine Bryant, model, dancer
 Johnny Christ, bassist for hard rock/metal band, Avenged Sevenfold
 Evelyn Cisneros, ballerina, former principal dancer for the San Francisco Ballet
 Kevin Elster, former MLB baseball player
 Bob Forrest, vocalist of the bands Thelonious Monster and The Bicycle Thief
 Chanda Gunn, Olympic bronze medalist in 2006, women's ice hockey goaltender
 Adam Hayward, NFL football player for the Tampa Bay Buccaneers
 Alan Knipe, head coach of the Long Beach State 49ers men's volleyball team and former head coach of the United States men's national volleyball team 
 Dave Mustaine, lead vocalist and guitarist for hard rock/metal band, Megadeth
 Natalie Nakase, basketball player and coach
 Marc Newfield, former MLB baseball player
Lute Olson, NCAA Champion basketball coach 
 Cherokee Parks, former NBA basketball player
 Tony Parrish, former NFL football player
 Joe Penny, actor 
 Justin Sellers, infielder for the Pittsburgh Pirates
 Victoria Anthony, 2015 and 2017 U.S. Open champion and Olympian.

Notable faculty
 Jerry Simon, American-Israeli basketball player

Demographics 
 
The demographics of Marina High School are as follows:
 Male:54%,
 Female:46%,
 White:49.8%,
 Hispanic:19.7%,
 Asian:20.1%,
 Black:1%,
 Two Races:2.9%,
 American Indian:5.9 %,
 Pacific Islander:.6%

References

External links
 Marina High School website
 Huntington Beach Union High School District website
 Marina High School's 2006 STAR (California Standardized Testing and Reporting) test scores
 Marina Football Website
 Marina Marching Band/Concert Band/Jazz Band/Orchestra/Drumline/Color Guard
Marina Choral/Vocal Music Website

Educational institutions established in 1963
High schools in Orange County, California
Buildings and structures in Huntington Beach, California
Education in Huntington Beach, California
Public high schools in California
1963 establishments in California